Justin Holbrook (born 13 January 1976) is an Australian professional rugby league coach who is the head coach of the Gold Coast Titans in the NRL and former professional rugby league footballer.

He previously coached St Helens in the Super League. He played as a goal-kicking  in the 1990s and 2000s for the Newcastle Knights, Penrith Panthers and the Sydney Roosters in the National Rugby League.

Playing career
Holbrook commenced his National Rugby League career with the Newcastle Knights in 1999 under coach Warren Ryan. He spent the 2001 NRL season with the Penrith Panthers under coach Royce Simmons. For the 2002 NRL season Holbrook played for the Sydney Roosters under coach Ricky Stuart. That year he played for the Roosters in the first ever ANZAC Day Cup match, kicking a goal. 2002 would be Holbrook's last season at the top level.

Coaching career
Holbrook turned to coaching after retiring from playing. He worked on the coaching staff of the Canterbury Bulldogs, St George Illawarra and Parramatta before joining the Sydney Roosters as right hand man to Trent Robinson. Holbrook also coached at representative level for Australia (under-21). He was appointed to replace Keiron Cunningham as head coach of English Super League club St. Helens. 

On 31 July 2019, it was announced that Holbrook signed a contract to become the new head coach at the Gold Coast for the 2020 season. In the weeks leading up to the announcement, Gold Coast Chairman Dennis Watt said that the next coaching appointment at the Gold Coast would be the club's last stand if results were to not improve under the new coach.

He was the St. Helens coach in the 2019 Challenge Cup Final defeat by the Warrington Wolves at Wembley Stadium.

During the Super League XXIV season, Holbrook guided St Helens to the League Leaders Shield after finishing 16 points clear of second placed Wigan.  Holbrook then coached St Helens to their 14th championship win after defeating Salford 23-6 in the 2019 Super League Grand Final at Old Trafford.

Holbrook's reign as the Gold Coast head coach got off to a difficult start with the club losing their first three games. In round 4 against the Wests Tigers, Holbrook guided the club to their first win in 364 days as they won the match 28-23 at Suncorp Stadium. The Gold Coast would go on to finish the 2020 season in 9th position, a major improvement on the previous year in which they finished last. In the 2021 season, Holbrook guided the Gold Coast into the finals for the first time since 2016, as the club finished 8th. They were defeated 24-25 in the first week of the finals by the Sydney Roosters.

References

External links
St Helens profile

1976 births
Living people
Australian rugby league coaches
Australian rugby league players
Gold Coast Titans coaches
Newcastle Knights players
Penrith Panthers players
Place of birth missing (living people)
Rugby league halfbacks
Rugby league hookers
St Helens R.F.C. coaches
Sydney Roosters players